Murdi (also Romanized as Mūrdī; also known as Mordeh and Qal‘eh-e Mūrdī) is a village in Now Bandegan Rural District, Now Bandegan District, Fasa County, Fars Province, Iran. At the 2006 census, its population was 516, in 112 families.

References 

Populated places in Fasa County